The Sallen–Key topology is an electronic filter topology used to implement second-order active filters that is particularly valued for its simplicity. It is a degenerate form of a voltage-controlled voltage-source (VCVS) filter topology.

Explanation of operation
A VCVS filter uses a voltage amplifier with practically infinite input impedance and zero output impedance to implement a 2-pole low-pass, high-pass, bandpass, bandstop, or allpass response. The VCVS filter allows high Q factor and passband gain without the use of inductors. A VCVS filter also has the advantage of independence: VCVS filters can be cascaded without the stages affecting each others tuning. A Sallen–Key filter is a variation on a VCVS filter that uses a unity-voltage-gain amplifier (i.e., a pure buffer amplifier). It was introduced by R. P. Sallen and E. L. Key of MIT Lincoln Laboratory in 1955.

History and implementation
In 1955, Sallen and Key used vacuum tube cathode follower amplifiers; the cathode follower is a reasonable approximation to an amplifier with unity voltage gain. Modern analog filter implementations may use operational amplifiers (also called op amps). Because of its high input impedance and easily selectable gain, an operational amplifier in a conventional non-inverting configuration is often used in VCVS implementations. Implementations of Sallen–Key filters often use an op amp configured as a voltage follower; however, emitter or source followers are other common choices for the buffer amplifier.

Sensitivity to component tolerances
VCVS filters are relatively resilient to component tolerance, but obtaining high Q factor may require extreme component value spread or high amplifier gain. Higher-order filters can be obtained by cascading two or more stages.

Generic Sallen–Key topology

The generic unity-gain Sallen–Key filter topology implemented with a unity-gain operational amplifier is shown in Figure 1. The following analysis is based on the assumption that the operational amplifier is ideal.

Because the op amp is in a negative-feedback configuration, its  and  inputs must match (i.e.). However, the inverting input  is connected directly to the output , and so

By Kirchhoff's current law (KCL) applied at the  node,

By combining equations (1) and (2),

Applying equation (1) and KCL at the op amp's non-inverting input  gives

which means that

Combining equations (2) and (3) gives

Rearranging equation (4) gives the transfer function

which typically describes a second-order linear time-invariant (LTI) system.

The buffer amplifier bootstraps the "bottom" of the  component to the output of the filter, which will improve upon the simple two-divider case. This interpretation is the reason why Sallen–Key filters are often drawn with the op amp's non-inverting input below the inverting input, thus emphasizing the similarity between the output and ground.

Branch impedances

In the examples below, recall that a resistor with resistance  has impedance  of

and a capacitor with capacitance  has impedance  of

That is, a capacitor's impedance is frequency-dependent and a resistor's impedance is not.

Application: low-pass filter

An example of a unity-gain low-pass configuration is shown in Figure 2.
An operational amplifier is used as the buffer here, although an emitter follower is also effective. This circuit is equivalent to the generic case above with

The transfer function for this second-order unity-gain low-pass filter is

where the undamped natural frequency , attenuation , Q factor , and damping ratio , are given by

and

So,

The  factor determines the height and width of the peak of the frequency response of the filter. As this parameter increases, the filter will tend to "ring" at a single resonant frequency near  (see "LC filter" for a related discussion).

Poles and zeros

This transfer function has no (finite) zeros and two poles located in the complex s-plane:

There are two zeros at infinity (the transfer function goes to zero for each of the  terms in the denominator).

Design choices
The  value is critical in determining the eventual shape.
By comparison, a value of  corresponds to the series cascade of two identical simple low-pass filters.

Because there are 2 parameters and 4 unknowns, the design procedure typically fixes the ratio between both resistors as well as that between the capacitors. So,

and

In practice, certain choices of component values will perform better than others due to the non-idealities of real operational amplifiers. As an example, high resistor values will increase the circuit's noise production, whilst contributing to the DC offset voltage on the output of op amps equipped with bipolar input transistors.

Example
The transfer function is given by

and, after the substitution, this expression is equal to

A similar design approach is used for the other filters below.

Input impedance 
The input impedance of the second-order unity-gain Sallen–Key low-pass filter is also of interest to designers. It is given by Eq. (3) in Cartwright and Kaminsky as

Fortunately, this equation is well-approximated by

For  values outside of this range, the 0.34 constant has to be modified for minimal error.

Also, the frequency at which the minimal impedance magnitude occurs is given by Eq. (15) of Cartwright and Kaminsky, i.e.,

This equation can also be well approximated using Eq. (20) of Cartwright and Kaminsky, which states that

Application: high-pass filter

A second-order unity-gain high-pass filter has the transfer function

where undamped natural frequency  and  factor are discussed above in the low-pass filter discussion. The circuit above implements this transfer function by the equations

(as before) and

So

Follow an approach similar to the one used to design the low-pass filter above.

Application: bandpass filter 

An example of a non-unity-gain bandpass filter implemented with a VCVS filter is shown in Figure 5. Although it uses a different topology and an operational amplifier configured to provide non-unity-gain, it can be analyzed using similar methods as with the generic Sallen–Key topology. Its transfer function is given by

The center frequency  (i.e., the frequency where the magnitude response has its peak) is given by

The Q factor  is given by

The voltage divider in the negative feedback loop controls the "inner gain"  of the op amp:

If the inner gain  is too high, the filter will oscillate.

See also
 Filter design
 Electronic filter topology
 Harmonic oscillator
 Resonance

References

External links
 Texas Instruments Application Report: Analysis of the Sallen–Key Architecture
 Analog Devices filter design tool – A simple online tool for designing active filters using voltage-feedback op-amps.
 TI active filter design source FAQ
 Op Amps for Everyone – Chapter 16
 High frequency modification of Sallen-Key filter - improving the stopband attenuation floor
 Online Calculation Tool for Sallen–Key Low-pass/High-pass Filters
 Online Calculation Tool for Filter Design and Analysis
 ECE 327: Procedures for Output Filtering Lab – Section 3 ("Smoothing Low-Pass Filter") discusses active filtering with Sallen–Key Butterworth low-pass filter.
 Filtering 101: Multi Pole Filters with Sallen-Key, Matt Duff of Analog Devices explains how Sallen Key circuit works

Linear filters
Electronic filter topology